Ramachandran Mokeri ( – 4 September 2022) was a theater person based in Kerala. He especially focused on revolutionary social theater practice in Kerala. He was a theater  activist, actor, director, writer and scholar from north  Kerala, South India. Mokeri worked as director at School of Drama and Fine Arts which is  University of Calicut's campus. The school located in Aranattukara, a suburb of Thrissur city this department of the university provides formal education and training in drama and theatre. The school is affiliated with National School of Drama.[3]

He collaborated with Malayalam film directors such as Chintha Ravi.

References

1940s births
Year of birth missing
2022 deaths
Indian theatre directors
Malayali people
Indian male dramatists and playwrights
Dramatists and playwrights from Kerala